Winthrop M. Crane (1853–1920) was a U.S. Senator from Massachusetts from 1904 to 1913.

Senator Crane may also refer to:

Jesse D. Crane (1841–1914), Michigan State Senate
Mike Crane (born 1964), Georgia State Senate
Robert C. Crane (1920–1962), New Jersey State Senate
Winston Crane (1990–2002), Australian Senate